The canton of Cazouls-lès-Béziers is an administrative division of the Hérault department, southern France. It was created at the French canton reorganisation which came into effect in March 2015. Its seat is in Cazouls-lès-Béziers.

Composition 

It consists of the following communes:

Autignac
Cabrerolles
Causses-et-Veyran
Caussiniojouls
Cazouls-lès-Béziers
Colombiers
Faugères
Fos
Fouzilhon
Gabian
Laurens
Magalas
Margon
Maraussan
Maureilhan
Montady
Montesquieu
Murviel-lès-Béziers
Neffiès
Pailhès
Pouzolles
Puimisson
Roquessels
Roujan
Saint-Geniès-de-Fontedit
Saint-Nazaire-de-Ladarez
Thézan-lès-Béziers
Vailhan

Councillors

Pictures of the canton

References 

Cantons of Hérault